Gabriela Katarina Pichler (born 11 March 1980 in Huddinge) is a Swedish film director and screenwriter.

Biography 
Pichler and her family moved from Stockholm to Örkelljunga when she was eight years old. Her mother, Ruzica Pichler, is from Bosnia and her father is from Austria. Her mother plays one of the roles in her 2012 feature film debut Eat Sleep Die. Pichler attended Öland's documentary school and School of Film Directing in Gothenburg.

In 2010, she received a Guldbagge Award at the 45th Guldbagge Awards, in the category for Best Short film for Scratches (Skrapsår), which was her thesis at the School of Film Directing. The same year she received the Bo Widerberg Scholarship.

Pichler's first feature film, Eat Sleep Die, premiered in Sweden on 5 October 2012. The film won the Audience Award in International Film Critics' Week at the 69th Venice International Film Festival. Pichler was awarded two Guldbagge Awards at the 48th Guldbagge Awards for her work on the film; Best Directing and Best Screenplay. The film was also awarded in the category Best Film. For the film, she was also awarded the Jan Myrdal Society's little literary prize "The Robespierre Prize" on 13 April 2013 in Varberg.

References

External links 

 
 

1980 births
Living people
Swedish film directors
Swedish screenwriters
Best Director Guldbagge Award winners
Best Screenplay Guldbagge Award winners
People from Örkelljunga
Swedish women film directors
Swedish women screenwriters